After School Club is a South Korean variety show, internet based live music request television talk show hosted by K-pop idols Allen and Taeyoung (Cravity) and Aaron Kwak.

Episodes

2013

2014

2015

2016

2017

2018

2019

2020

2021

2022

2023

Notes

References 

Lists of variety television series episodes
Lists of South Korean television series episodes